Aréthuse was a 40-gun frigate of the French Navy, built from 1789 following plans by Ozanne.

Career 
She was launched on 3 March 1791, and served in the Mediterranean under Captain Bouvet.

In 1793, she cruised off the Pyrenees, along with the 40-gun frigate Topaze.

During the Siege of Toulon, Royalist rioters surrendered Aréthuse to the British. She escaped to Portoferraio when the city fell, and was brought into Royal Navy service as HMS Arethuse.

In July 1795, she was renamed HMS Undaunted.

On 9 February 1796, she sailed for the Leeward Islands under the command of Henry Roberts. She then joined Captain Thomas Parr, in the fourth rate HMS Malabar, as part of the squadron that occupied the Dutch colonies of Demerara, Essequibo and Berbice in April and May.

On 27 August 1796, under the command of Robert Winthrop, she was wrecked on the Morant Cays in the West Indies.

References
Notes

Bibliography

 

Age of Sail frigates of France
Maritime incidents in 1796
Ships built in France
1791 ships